Richard Bethell (10 May 1772 – 25 December 1864) was a British Tory and then Conservative Party politician from Rise in the East Riding of Yorkshire. He sat in the House of Commons between 1830 and 1841.

Life
He was the son of the Rev. Richard Bethell, rector of Wallingford, and was born at Isleworth. He was educated at Eton College, and matriculated at King's College, Cambridge in 1791, graduating B.A. in 1795. He was a Fellow of King's from 1794 to 1799.

When William Bethell died, he inherited property at Rise and Watton Abbey. He was High Sheriff of Yorkshire from 1822 to 1823. At the 1830 general election, he was elected as one of the four Members of Parliament (MPs) for Yorkshire. He did not contest the seat in 1831, but when the Yorkshire constituency was divided under the Reform Act 1832, he was elected at the 1832 general election as one of the two MPs for the East Riding of Yorkshire. He was re-elected in 1835 and 1837, and held the seat until he stood down at the 1841 general election.

References

External links 
 

1772 births
1864 deaths
Tory MPs (pre-1834)
Conservative Party (UK) MPs for English constituencies
UK MPs 1830–1831
UK MPs 1832–1835
UK MPs 1835–1837
UK MPs 1837–1841
High Sheriffs of Yorkshire
Fellows of King's College, Cambridge
East York Militia officers